National Highway 107A, commonly called NH 107A is a national highway in  India. It is a spur road of National Highway 7. NH-107A traverses the state of Uttarakhand in India.

Route 
Chamoli, Gopeshwar, Mandal Okhimath, Baramwari.

Junctions  

  Terminal near Chamoli.
  Terminal near Baramwari.

See also 
 List of National Highways in India
 List of National Highways in India by state

References

External links 

 NH 107A on OpenStreetMap

National highways in India
National Highways in Uttarakhand